Adolf Staehelin (also Adolf Stähelin; 5 April 1901 — 30 May 1965) was a Swiss chess player, Swiss Chess Championship winner (1927).

Biography
In the 1920s and 1930s, Adolf Staehelin was one of the leading Swiss chess players. In 1927, he won Swiss Chess Championship. In 1932, Adolf Staehelin participated in strong International Chess Tournament in Berne (tournament won Alexander Alekhine). He was Vice President of the Zurich Chess Society.

Adolf Staehelin played for Switzerland in the Chess Olympiad:
 In 1935, at fourth board in the 6th Chess Olympiad in Warsaw (+2, =3, -11).

Adolf Staehelin played for Switzerland in the unofficial Chess Olympiad:
 In 1936, at sixth board in the 3rd unofficial Chess Olympiad in Munich (+4, =5, -9).

References

External links

Adolf Staehelin chess games at 365chess.com

1901 births
1965 deaths
Sportspeople from Basel-Stadt
Swiss chess players
Chess Olympiad competitors
20th-century chess players